The Qatar Chess Federation is a non-profit organization that promotes chess in Qatar.

History
The Qatar Chess Foundation was created in 1985. Khalifa Mohammed Al-Hitmi became its general secretary and president in 1989. In 2006, the Qatar Chess Federation is represented for the first time at the Asian Games. It was then led by Mohammed Al-Modiahki who organized the Qatar Masters Open in December 2015.

Related pages
Mohammed Al-Modiahki
Qatar Masters Open

References

External links
Official Website

Arab organizations
Chess organizations
Chess in Qatar
1975 in chess
Sports organizations established in 1975
1975 establishments in Qatar